Angel Raymond Wagenstein (born 17 October 1922) is a Bulgarian screenwriter and author. Wagenstein was born in Plovdiv, Bulgaria, but spent his childhood in France where his Jewish family emigrated for political reasons due to their leftist politics.

Angel Wagenstein returned to Bulgaria due to an amnesty, and as a student at a lyceum, where he joined an anti-fascist group. He was interned in a labour camp for Jews in Macedonia, but escaped from it. After a combat mission, he was arrested and condemned to death in 1944, but the execution was first delayed by the Anglo-American bombing of Sofia, which destroyed parts of the prison and forced the relocation of the inmates to another facility, and then prevented by the anti-fascist (mostly Communist) takeover and the roughly simultaneous invasion of the Soviet Red Army.

After completing a degree in 1950 in film screenwriting at the S. A. Gerasimov All-Union State Institute for Cinematography in Moscow, he worked as a screenplay writer for the Bulgarian Cinematography Center and for the DEFA Film Studio (the former East Germany Cinematography Center). He is author of over fifty screenplays for films, documentaries and cartoons. He became famous with his movies about Bulgarian Communists, especially partisans.

His film Stars, shot in 1959 by the German director Konrad Wolf, was awarded the Special Jury Prize at the 1959 Cannes Film Festival. In 1980, he was a member of the jury at the 30th Berlin International Film Festival.

His fiction includes the triptych Петокнижие Исааково (Isaac's Torah), Далеч от Толедо (Far from Toledo) and Сбогом, Шанхай (Farewell, Shanghai), which have been published both separately and together not only in Bulgarian but also in French, German, Russian, English, Czech, Polish, Macedonian, Spanish, Italian and Hebrew. Far from Toledo was awarded in 2002 the Alberto Benveniste annual prize of the Sorbonne, while his novel Farewell Shanghai received the Jean Monnet Prize of European literature in 2004. The French government awarded Angel Wagenstein the high distinction of Chevalier of the French Order of Merit, and later Chevalier of Arts and Literature. He is also the bearer of the highest Bulgarian distinction – the Stara Planina Order. In 2009, he was made honorary citizen of the city of Plovdiv. A documentary film about his life, Angel Wagenstein: Art Is a Weapon, was produced by American director Andrea Simon in 2017 and won the Audience Award at the South East European Film Festival.

The East German movie Eolomea is based on one of his works.

He is married to Zora, with whom he has two sons, Raymond and Plamen. He turned 100 in October 2022.

Prizes and nominations 

 "Farewell, Shanghai"
 Jean Monnet Prize of European literature 2004
 Shortlisted for VICK 2004 annual prize
 Nomination for the international literary prize of Haus der Kulturen in Berlin

 "Isaac's Torah"
 Hristo Botev annual prize 1998
 Adei Wizo Literary Prize 2010

 "Far from Toledo"
 Bulgarian Writers Association annual prize 2002
 “” for Sepharade literature 2003

Selected filmography
 Two Victories (dir. Borislav Sharaliev, 1956)
 Stars (dir. Konrad Wolf, 1959)
 Two Under the Sky (dir. Borislav Sharaliev, 1962)
 The Story of a Murder (dir. , 1965) — based on the novel Die Jünger Jesu by Leonhard Frank)
  (dir. Konrad Wolf, 1966, TV film) — based on The Little Prince by Antoine de Saint-Exupéry
  (dir. Wolfgang Staudte, 1968)
 Aesop (dir. Rangel Valchanov, 1970)
 Goya or the Hard Way to Enlightenment (dir. Konrad Wolf, 1971) — based on a novel by Lion Feuchtwanger
 Eolomea (dir. Herrmann Zschoche, 1972)
 Dopalnenie kam zakona za zashtita na darzhavata (dir. Ludmil Staikov, 1976)
 Stars in Her Hair, Tears in Her Eyes (dir. Ivan Nitchev, 1977)
 Boris I (dir. Borislav Sharaliev, 1985) 
 Bordello (dir. Nikos Koundouros, 1985)
 Coasts in the Mist (dir. Yuli Karasik, 1986)
 Shanghai 1937 (dir. Peter Patzak, 1997, TV film) — based on a novel by Vicki Baum
 After the End of the World (dir. Ivan Nitchev, 1998)

References

External links 
 IMDb entry
 Angel Wagenstein: Art Is a Weapon at IMDb
 Brief Biography
 Brief Biography
 Film credits
 Reference on the Bulgarian Writers' Union website
 S. A. Gerasimov All-Union State Institute for Cinematography Всероссийский государственный университет кинематографии им. С.А. Герасимова
 http://www.colibri.bg/resultsb.php?book=412
 http://www.colibri.bg/resultsb.php?book=43
 http://www.colibri.bg/resultsb.php?book=44

1922 births
Living people
Bulgarian people of Jewish descent
20th-century Sephardi Jews
21st-century Sephardi Jews
20th-century Bulgarian people
Bulgarian screenwriters
Male screenwriters
20th-century Bulgarian novelists
21st-century Bulgarian novelists
Jewish novelists
Bulgarian male writers
Bulgarian expatriates in France
Film people from Plovdiv
Writers from Plovdiv
Bulgarian resistance members
Bulgarian prisoners sentenced to death
People condemned by Nazi courts
Bulgarian centenarians
Men centenarians